Powder were a Los Angeles pop rock band formed in 2001 by vocalist Ninette Terhart and guitarist Phil X.
They released 3 albums, Sonic Machine in 2002, Powder in 2004, and Nothing in 2008.

Former band members
Ninette Terhart - Lead vocals (2001–2010)
 Phil X - Guitars (2001–2010)
Allan Hearn - Bass guitar (2001–2006)
J-Bo Dynamite (Jeremy Spencer) - Drums (2001–2010)
Daniel Spriewald - Bass guitar (2006–2010)

Discography
Sonic Machine - 2002
Powder - 2004
Nothing - 2008

References

Musical groups established in 2001
Musical groups from Los Angeles
American pop rock music groups